The Akyazı Stadium, officially known as the Şenol Güneş Spor Kompleksi Akyazı Stadyumu, is a stadium located in Trabzon, Turkey. It opened to public on 18 December 2016 and has a capacity of 40,782 spectators. 

It is the new home of Trabzonspor of the Süper Lig, replacing Hüseyin Avni Aker Stadium. It is named after the Turkish football manager and former goalkeeper of Trabzonspor and Turkey national football team, as well as former coach of the national team, Şenol Güneş.

In 2017, interactive monitors were installed in the stadium's press seats, which provides match streaming, player information, etc.

There are plans to connect the stadium to Trabzon's City Center with the new Trabzon Tram per a 2022 announcement by the region's mayor.

References

Football venues in Turkey
Trabzonspor
Sport in Trabzon
Sports venues in Trabzon
Sports venues completed in 2016
2016 establishments in Turkey